The 1965 season in Japanese football saw the formation of the Japan Soccer League, the first national league in Japan for football clubs. Eight teams took part in the championship, playing on a home and away basis. Toyo Industries were crowned the first ever champions, whilst Nagoya Mutual Bank came bottom and entered and end of season promotion/relegation match to stay in the top flight. They won this, 6–3 on aggregate against Nippon Kokan.

Teams

Eight clubs entered the first ever edition of the Japan Soccer League; Furukawa Electric, Hitachi, Mitsubishi Motors, Nagoya Mutual Bank, Toyo Industries, Toyoda Automatic Loom Works, Yanmar Diesel and Yawata Steel

League tables

Japan Soccer League

Promotion/relegation Series
 
Nagoya Mutual Bank stays in JSL.

All-Star Game

References
1965 season at Contents of Domestic Competition of Football in Japan
1965 season at JSL Ganbare!

1965
1
Jap
Jap